Demintha Dahanayake (born 19 September 1986) is a Sri Lankan cricketer. He is a right-handed batsman and right-arm off-break bowler who plays for Saracens Sports Club. He was born in Kandy.

Dahanayake made his cricketing debut for Nondescripts in the 2006 Under-23 Tournament, a tournament in which he has participated in each season to 2009.

Dahanayake made his List A debut for the senior side during the 2008-09 Premier Limited Overs Tournament, against Bloomfield Cricket and Athletic Club.

Dahanayake's first-class debut came during the 2009–10 season, against Saracens Sports Club. From the upper order, he scored a duck in the only innings in which he batted.

External links
Demintha Dahanayake at Cricket Archive 

1986 births
Living people
Sri Lankan cricketers
Saracens Sports Club cricketers
Nondescripts Cricket Club cricketers
Cricketers from Kandy
Sri Lanka Cricket Combined XI cricketers